Legislative Council elections were held in Punjab Province in British India in late 1923. They were the second legislative council elections held in the province under the Government of India Act 1919. The newly elected Council was constituted on 2 January 1924 when its first meeting was held.

Sheikh Abdul Qadir was elected as its president. He resigned from the office when he was appointed as Minister of Education and was succeeded by Shahab-ud-din. The Council held its last meeting on 25 October 1926 and was dissolved on 27 October. It held 102 meetings.

Distribution of seats

Special^ (Non-Territorial)

 Punjab Landholders - 3
 General - 1
 Mohammadan - 1
 Sikh - 1
 Baluch Tumandars - 1
 Punjab Universities - 1
 Punjab Commerce and Trade - 1
 Punjab Industry - 1

Voter Statistics
Total Voters = 6,15,503
Vote Turnout = 52.82%
Territorial Constituencies voters - 6,10,199
Highest Number of voters - 21,309 in Jehlum (Muhammadan-Rural)
Lowest Number of voters - 1,652 in Gurgaon (General-Rural)
Highest Turnout - 72.8% in East West Central Towns (General-Urban)
Lowest Turnout - 14.6% in Lahore (Sikh-Rural)
Non-Territorial Constituencies voters - 5,304
Highest Number of voters - 2,398 in Punjab Universities 
Lowest Number of voters - 11 in Baluch Tumandars 
Highest Turnout - 84.4% in Punjab Universities 
Lowest Turnout - 72.4% in Punjab Landholders (Sikh)

Office bearer

Ex-Officio Members 

Ministers

Election Schedule

 Election schedule in special constituencies were not same and the dates were different, unfortunately not available.

Results

Constituency wise result
 Candidate Elected Unopposed 

General-Urban

General-Rural

Muhammadan-Urban

Muhammadan-Rural

Sikh-Urban

Sikh-Rural

Special

See also
Punjab legislative council (British India)

References

Punjab
State Assembly elections in Punjab, India

External links